Secret Story - Casa dos Segredos 3 is the third season of the Portuguese version of the reality show Secret Story, based on the original French version and of Big Brother. Audition for this season was opened in June 2012.

The season started on 16 September 2012 and ended 107 days later with the final on 31 December 2012, which acclaimed Rúben as the winner.

Housemates

Alexandra 
Alexandra is a Dj and comes from Porto. She is 26 years old. She is very conceited and is very careful with her body. She practised figure skating and hip-hop and has done some modelling jobs. She wants to go to the house to mature and to understand her flaws. She goes to the gym to gain some weight.
 Secret: My ex is in the house (with Fábio).

Ana 
Ana is 24 years old, comes from Estarreja and is an electromedicine technician. She likes to take care of her image and is addicted to going to the hairdresser. She loves to sing in the karaoke and dance. She is explosive, impulsive and has no tabus. She wants to go to the secret story house to become famous.
Secret: I'm bisexual.

Arnaldo 
Arnaldo is 25 years old and comes from Lisbon. He loves fashion and is always dressed fashionably. He does boxing and kickboxing. He likes to dance and to go out at night to African discos. He's a big romantic but there's one love that comes above all: his two-year-old daughter, Fabiana. He doesn't have any limits in the Secret Story house and wants to win to give his daughter everything she deserves.
 Secret: I was shot.

Bruno 
Bruno is 22 years old and lives in Lagoa de Mira, Coimbra. He's a marketer and works with his parents but would like to work in fashion. He loves to travel, listen to music and dance in traditional dances. He is a success with the ladies and says he is irresistible because of his killer look.
Secret: We are a couple chosen by A Voz (with Jéssica).

Cátia Marisa 
Cátia Marisa is 25 years old and lives in São Mamede de Infesta. She's fun and loves to sing and dance. She considers herself the biggest fan of Portuguese singer Mickael Carreira. Cátia Marisa doesn't have a lot of luck with men and wants to go to the Secret Story house to become famous.
 Secret: I became a mother when I was 15.

Cláudio 
Cláudio is 25 years old and comes from Vila Nova de Gaia. He has a master's degree in physical education and is a personal trainer. He considered himself an attractive and good looking man. He is very careful with his body and works out every single day. He loves to surf, wakeboard, snowboard and football. He says that life has presented him with challenges and when he decides to enter one he refuses to lose.
Secret: I survived an earthquake.

Daniela & Nicole 
Daniela and Nicole are twin sisters. They are 20 years old and they live in Rio Tinto. At the beginning of the show was revealed that only one of them would become a housemate and that the decision was to be made by both of them. At the end of the show was revealed that both of them would be at the house but they would play as one.
 Secret: We are the accomplices of A Voz.

Fábio 
Fábio lives with his parents in Porto and works at a shoe store. He loves his lips and eyes but thinks he has the perfect nipples. He is seductive but doesn't fall in love very easily.  At the moment he doesn't have a girlfriend. He loves to go out at night and to spend hours having deep conversations. He loves soccer and gym. He wants to go into the Secret Story house to win.
Secret: My ex is in the house (with Alexandra).

Hélio 
Hélio worked as a chef in his parents' restaurant but got fired due to the financial crisis. Nowadays he organizes art, design and multimedia events. He doesn't have a girlfriend but guarantees he always gets the hotties girls even being plus-sized. He wants to enter the Secret Story house to find someone to get married. If he could change his job he would like to work as a philosopher.
Secret: I'm an internet phenomenon.

Jean-Mark 
Jean-Mark is 21 years old and lives in Vila Nova de Gaia with his grandmother since his parents work in Mozambique. He works as a trainee in a travel agency. He was born in South Africa but moved to Portugal when he was 16 due to the rising insecurity. He loves animals and nature since he was born in that environment. He had a lot of dates but got scared with almost all of them because they started talking about marriage. He faces life in a very positive and relaxed way. Jean-Mark loves to party with his friends.
Secret: I lost my virginity at the age of 12.

Jéssica 
Jéssica is 19 years old and comes from Almada. She's an only child and is very spoiled by her family. Her parents call her Rebel Princess. She likes to take care of her look and she loves to go out at night, getting her nails done and shopping. She wants to enter the Secret Story house to become independent from her parents.
Secret: We are a couple chosen by A Voz (with Bruno).

Joana 
Joana is 23 years old and comes from Maia. She's taking a degree in PR and she works in her dad's travel agency. She loves to travel and to buy shoes. She practiced karting and soccer. She wants to go to the Secret Story house to win the final prize and to be famous.
Secret: I was kept hostage in a prison in Venezuela.

Mara 
Mara is 25 years old and was born and raised in Funchal. She works in a whale watching company. She's shy and loves photography. One of her dreams is to become a fashion model. She wants to go to the Secret Story house to give her life a new perspective.
Secret: My twin sister is in the house (with Petra).

Nuno 
Nuno is 24 years old and comes from Camarate and has played professional soccer but abandoned his career to working in his father's company. He doesn't have a girlfriend and likes drama-free relationships. He likes women with nice shoes and that's the first thing he notices when meeting someone. In 2008 he won the title of "Best Portuguese Butt" by a well-known clothes company. He wants to enter the Secret Story house to become famous and to help his father's company.
Secret: I was abandoned by my mother the day I became 12.

Petra 
Petra is 25 years old, comes from Lisbon and is taking a master's degree in education. She's vain and loves to buy bags and shoes. She's very careful with her body and practices several martial arts like Muay Thai. She has a very bad temper when waking up. She wants to go to the Secret Story house to help her family.
Secret: My twin sister is in the house (with Mara).

Rúben 
Rúben is 22 years old and comes from Porto. He is in the army and is finishing his degree in social services. He's vain and likes to take care of his body. He goes to the gym and is a black belt in karate. He's ambitious and he only plays to win. He wants to enter the Secret Story house to be famous.
Secret: We are a real couple (with Tatiana).

Rui 
Rui is 21 years old and comes from Amadora. He works as a cashier at a supermarket but his dream is to become a model. He lives with his mother and his stepdad. His dad died when he was 3 years old and since then he has been spoiled by his mother. He's tall, handsome and is a success with the ladies.
Secret: I am the secret of the house.

Sandra 
Sandra is 22 years old, comes from Lustosa a village in Lousada and is taking an accounting course. She's the youngest of seven brothers. She's spontaneous and funny. Her biggest dream is to become an actress.
Secret: I slept with my parents until the age of 16.

Tatiana 
Tatiana is 19 years old and lives alone in Vila Nova de Gaia since her parents are working in Angola. She loves to ride a bicycle and going to the beach. She wants to enter the Secret Story house to test her limits and to have fun.
Secret: We are a real couple (with Rúben).

Tracy 
Tracy is 18 years old and comes from Jersey, U.K. Her biggest dream is to become a model and that's why she wants to enter the Secret Story house. She thinks she is very different from the British girls since she's more discreet and elegant. She's addicted to fashion and loves to keep up with the latest fashion trends. Tracy loves to take care of her body by controlling what she eats. Going to the gym and practising yoga is part of her daily routine. She wants to enter the house to prove to everyone else that she's not a snob girl.
Secret: Cristiano Ronaldo is my cousin.

Vanessa 
Vanessa is 22 years old and comes from Viana do Castelo. She is an oriental dancer. She's nice, calm and positive. She wants to enter the Secret Story house to help her family.
Secret: I was a victim of child labor.

Wilson 
Wilson is 25 years old and lives in Lisbon. He is a soccer coach and a professional poker player. He likes music and movies. He only had one girlfriend but a lot of one-night stands. He thinks the hardest thing to do is to make a woman smile. He considers himself a leader and a player. He loves challenges and being in the Secret Story house is the biggest one he ever had. His goal is to win.
Secret: I was in coma for a month.

Secrets
There are 18 secrets in the House for the third season.

Nominations Table 
Nominations follow a different formula than is typical of the Big Brother franchise. Each week the nominations alternated: male housemates nominate female housemates one week, and female housemates nominate male housemates the following week. In some weeks housemates are only permitted to nominate one housemate, rather than the typical two; this, usually occurs when at least one housemate has been already nominated by A Voz. Also, during some weeks, twist occur which affect the nomination procedure.

Notes
 Nominated by A Voz.
 Nomination to choose a housemate to save an original nominated.
 This housemate was fake evicted but returned to the house the next day or the same day.

Nominations: Results

Nomination Totals Received

Ratings 
Live Eviction Shows

Eviction #1 took place on a Tuesday instead of a Sunday when the usual eviction gala takes place.

External links
 Official Website 

2012 Portuguese television seasons
03